Football was contested for men only at the 1999 Summer Universiade in Palma, Spain.

References
 Universiade football medalists on HickokSports

1999 in association football
foottball
1999
1999
1999–2000 in Spanish football
1999–2000 in Italian football
1999 in Brazilian football